The 1965 ICF Canoe Slalom World Championships were held in Spittal an der Drau, Austria under the auspices of International Canoe Federation for the second time in a row after hosting the event previously in 1963. It was the 9th edition. It also marked some changes in which the folding kayak events were replaced by standard kayaks for the men's and women's events. Additionally, the mixed C2 team event returned for the first time since 1957.

Medal summary

Men's

Canoe

Kayak

Mixed

Canoe

Women's

Kayak

Medals table

References
Results
International Canoe Federation

Icf Canoe Slalom World Championships, 1965
Icf Canoe Slalom World Championships, 1965
ICF Canoe Slalom World Championships
International sports competitions hosted by Austria